Santa Maria Materdomini may refer to:

 Basilica of Santa Maria Mater Domini, church and monastery complex in Materdomini, Campania, Italy
 Santa Maria Materdomini, Naples, church in Naples, Italy
 Santa Maria Mater Domini, church in Venice, Italy

See also 
 Materdomini (disambiguation)

Buildings and structures disambiguation pages